Daniel Mason-Straus (born July 27, 1984), is an American professional mixed martial artist currently competing in the Featherweight division. He previously competed in Bellator MMA, where he is the former two-time Bellator Featherweight Champion. A professional competitor since 2009, Straus has also formerly competed for Shark Fights.

Background
Straus was born in Cincinnati, Ohio, and grew up in the nearby suburb of Sycamore Township. Straus came from a troubled household and by the time he was a junior in high school he was living on his own and supporting himself, which included involvement in criminal activities. Straus was a highly successful (and highly controversial) high school wrestler at Sycamore High School. As a freshman in the (112 lbs.) weight class, Straus was an alternate for the state tournament and in his sophomore season he went 2-2 in the state tournament. In his junior season, Straus finished third in the state in Division I (135 lbs.) and in his senior year he was ruled academically ineligible and missed the second half of the season (including the state tournament). However, he was given a wild card berth into the NHSCA Senior Nationals (high school senior national championship) and won the tournament. Straus is considered by some in the Ohio wrestling media to be one of the best Ohio wrestlers of the decade (2001–2010) and one of the greatest Ohio high school wrestlers to never win a state title. In addition to wrestling, Straus also played soccer and ran for the track and field team in high school. After graduating, Straus moved to Florida and worked in maintenance, but was arrested on robbery charges and was incarcerated from 2004-2007.

Mixed martial arts career

Early career
Straus returned to Cincinnati after his release from prison and was introduced to mixed martial arts by a friend who was a former high school wrestling opponent. He invited Straus to come train with him at Team Vision and Straus made his professional debut in February 2009.

Shark Fights
Straus was a late replacement for Marcus Hicks at Shark Fights 13: Jardine vs. Prangley where he beat WEC veteran Karen Darabedyan via unanimous decision.

Bellator MMA
Straus made his Bellator debut on June 24, 2010, at Bellator 23 where he defeated Chad Hinton via unanimous decision.

In January 2011, Bellator announced that Straus would be part of the Bellator Season Four Featherweight Tournament. In the quarter finals, Straus fought Nazareno Malegarie. Straus defeated Malegarie via unanimous decision to move on to the semifinals and give Malegarie the first loss of his career. The fight won Fight of the Night honors.

At Bellator 41, Straus competed in the semifinals of the Season Four Tournament against Kenny Foster. Straus controlled the fight for the first two rounds before he finished Foster via guillotine choke submission and moved on to the finals of the tournament. Straus met Patricio Freire in the Season Four Tournament Final at Bellator 45. He lost the fight via unanimous decision.

Straus returned in the Bellator Season Six Featherweight Tournament that started on March 9, 2012. He defeated Jeremy Spoon via unanimous decision in the opening round at Bellator 60. In the semifinal round, Straus faced Mike Corey at Bellator 65 and again won by unanimous decision.  In the finals, Straus faced Marlon Sandro at Bellator 68 and won via unanimous decision. This win earned him a title shot and rematch against Featherweight Champion Pat Curran, who had previous beaten Straus in 2009.

At Bellator 78, Straus took a fight to keep himself busy while waiting for his title shot. He fought Royce Gracie black belt, Alvin Robinson, defeating him via submission in the second round.

Straus was scheduled to face Pat Curran on April 4, 2013 for the Featherweight Title at Bellator 95.  However, on February 26, it was announced that Straus had broken his hand and had to pull out of the fight.

The Featherweight Championship fight between Curran and Straus took place on November 2, 2013 at Bellator 106. Straus won the fight by unanimous decision to become the new Bellator Featherweight Champion.

Straus is scheduled to face Pat Curran for the third time at Bellator 112 on March 14, 2014. Straus publicly expressed his displeasure in having to face Curran again so soon after beating him, going so far as to say he believes Bellator wants Curran as champion. However, he also stated it is his job to fight and he welcomed the bout.  At the weigh ins for Bellator 112, Straus had to cut his hair to make weight. He lost the bout via rear naked choke in the fifth round.

Straus faced Justin Wilcox in the main event at Bellator 127 on October 3, 2014. He won the fight via knockout in the first round.

Straus challenged Patrício Freire for the Bellator Featherweight Championship in a rematch at Bellator 132 on January 16, 2015. Freire won the back-and-forth fight in the fourth round via a rear-naked choke submission.

Straus faced undefeated prospect Henry Corrales at Bellator 138 on June 19, 2015. He won the fight via submission in the second round.

Straus had a third fight with Freire on November 6, 2015 at Bellator 145. He won the fight via unanimous decision to reclaim the Bellator Featherweight Championship.

Over a year since his last fight, Straus returned to defend his title against Freire in a fourth fight in the main event at Bellator 178 on April 21, 2017. After a back-and-forth first round, Straus lost the bout via a submission due to a guillotine choke early in the second round.

Straus faced Emmanuel Sanchez at Bellator 184 on October 6, 2017. He lost the fight via triangle choke submission in the third round.

After a 17-month long layoff due to severe injuries suffered in a motorcycle accident, Straus returned to the cage on March 29, 2019 at Bellator 219 and faced Shane Krutchen. He was victorious by way of first round submission.

Straus next faced Derek Campos in the opening round of the Bellator Featherweight World Grand Prix at Bellator 226 on September 7, 2019. He lost the bout via unanimous decision.

On July 10, 2021, it was announced that he was no longer under contract with Bellator.

Post Bellator 
Straus faced Keith Richardson on October 23, 2021 in the co-main event of XMMA 3. He lost the bout via TKO due to ground and pound.

Personal life
Straus has a daughter.

On March 1, 2013, Straus was arrested in Fort Lauderdale, Florida after his vehicle was pulled over. He faced charges of driving with a suspended license, possession of more than 20 grams of marijuana, more than three grams of synthetic cannabis, possession of drug paraphernalia, and possession of MDMA.

In the early morning hours of December 17, 2017, Straus was involved in an accident while riding his Suzuki GSX-R1000 motorcycle on State Road 7 in Dade County, Florida. He was unconscious for an unknown amount of time, and was unable to move his extremities upon regaining consciousness. His passenger was able to get help and Straus was transported to hospital. Although no alcohol was involved, it is still unknown what caused the accident. His passenger was unharmed. 
It would take eight months and extreme physical therapy before Straus could walk again on his own. Once able to move again without assistance, Daniel Straus made the decision to get back into physical shape and continue his professional MMA career. His long journey back culminated with his comeback fight at Bellator 219 on March 29, 2019, a bout which he won via submission.

On February 6, 2021, Straus was arrested in Broward County, Florida and was charged with one count of aggravated battery with a weapon after he allegedly assaulted his ex-girlfriend with a sharp object. According to the affidavit, Straus showed up to the alleged victim's place of work after the two argued over text message. Once he arrived, the two allegedly got into a verbal dispute. Straus followed the alleged victim as she walked to her car, at which point the victim claims the incident turned violent. According to the victims statement to police, she alleges Straus pushed her and she pushed back, claiming that when she attempted to get into her vehicle to leave, Straus struck her in the left side of her face and knocked her to the ground. She further states that after he struck her, Straus got in his vehicle and left the scene. She stated that Straus called her and said he was at her apartment, and fearing Straus would destroy her property, she drove to his apartment to destroy his property. When Straus arrived at his apartment, he allegedly attacked the victim with a sharp object. The victim fled the scene as quickly as she could and went to a neighbor's home, and from there she was taken to a nearby hospital for examination. The alleged victim then pressed charges, after which an arrest warrant for Straus was issued, and he was picked up and booked into the Broward County jail on the aggravated battery with a weapon charge, a felony, with his bail being set at $100,000.

Championships and accomplishments

Mixed martial arts
Bellator MMA
Bellator Featherweight World Championship (Two times)
Bellator Season Four Featherweight Tournament Runner-up
Bellator Season Six Featherweight Tournament Winner
North American Allied Fight Series
NAAFS Undisputed Pro Series Lightweight Championship (One time)
NAAFS Interim Pro Series Lightweight Championship (One time)
MMA Junkie
November 2015 Fight of the Month vs. Patricio Freire on November 6

Amateur Wrestling
National High School Coaches Association
NHSCA Senior High School National Championship (2003)
NHSCA Senior All-American (2003)
Ohio High School Athletic Association
OHSAA Division I High School State Championship Third Place (2002)
OHSAA Division I All-State (2002)
Sycamore High School Record for Best Season Record (42-1; 2003)

Mixed martial arts record

|-
|Loss
|align=center| 26–10
|Keith Richardson
|TKO (punches)
|XMMA 3: Vice City
|
|align=center|2
|align=center|1:54
|Miami, Florida, United States
|
|-
|Loss
|align=center| 26–9
|Derek Campos 
|Decision (unanimous)
|Bellator 226 
|
|align=center|3
|align=center|5:00
|San Jose, California, United States 
|
|-
| Win
| align=center| 26–8
| Shane Kruchten
| Submission (rear-naked choke)
| Bellator 219
| 
| align=center| 1
| align=center| 3:53
| Temecula, California, United States
| 
|-
| Loss
| align=center| 25–8
| Emmanuel Sanchez
| Submission (triangle choke)
| Bellator 184
| 
| align=center| 3
| align=center| 1:56
| Thackerville, Oklahoma, United States
| 
|-
| Loss
| align=center| 25–7
| Patricio Freire
| Submission (guillotine choke)
| Bellator 178
| 
| align=center| 2
| align=center| 0:37
| Uncasville, Connecticut, United States
| 
|-
| Win
| align=center| 25–6
| Patricio Freire
| Decision (unanimous)
| Bellator 145
| 
| align=center| 5
| align=center| 5:00
| St. Louis, Missouri, United States
| 
|-
| Win
| align=center| 24–6
| Henry Corrales
| Submission (guillotine choke)
| Bellator 138
| 
| align=center| 2
| align=center| 3:47
| St. Louis, Missouri, United States
| 
|-
| Loss
| align=center| 23–6
| Patricio Freire
| Submission (rear-naked choke)
| Bellator 132
| 
| align=center| 4
| align=center| 4:49
| Temecula, California, United States
| 
|-
| Win
| align=center| 23–5
| Justin Wilcox
| KO (punches)
| Bellator 127
| 
| align=center| 1
| align=center| 0:50
| Temecula, California, United States
| 
|-
| Loss
| align=center| 22–5
| Pat Curran
| Submission (rear-naked choke)
| Bellator 112
| 
| align=center| 5
| align=center| 4:46
| Hammond, Indiana, United States
| 
|-
| Win
| align=center| 22–4
| Pat Curran
| Decision (unanimous)
| Bellator 106
| 
| align=center| 5
| align=center| 5:00
| Long Beach, California, United States
| 
|-
| Win
| align=center| 21–4
| Alvin Robinson 
| Submission (rear-naked choke)
| Bellator 78
| 
| align=center| 2
| align=center| 4:51
| Dayton, Ohio, United States
| 
|-
| Win
| align=center| 20–4
| Marlon Sandro
| Decision (unanimous)
| Bellator 68
| 
| align=center| 3
| align=center| 5:00
| Atlantic City, New Jersey, United States
| 
|-
| Win
| align=center| 19–4
| Mike Corey
| Decision (unanimous)
| Bellator 65
| 
| align=center| 3
| align=center| 5:00
| Atlantic City, New Jersey, United States
| 
|-
| Win
| align=center| 18–4
| Jeremy Spoon
| Decision (unanimous)
| Bellator 60
| 
| align=center| 3
| align=center| 5:00
| Hammond, Indiana, United States
| 
|-
| Win
| align=center| 17–4
| Jason Dent
| Decision (unanimous)
| NAAFS: Caged Fury 15
| 
| align=center| 5
| align=center| 5:00
| Cleveland, Ohio, United States
| 
|-
| Loss
| align=center| 16–4
| Patricio Freire
| Decision (unanimous)
| Bellator 45
| 
| align=center| 3
| align=center| 5:00
| Lake Charles, Louisiana, United States
| 
|-
| Win
| align=center| 16–3
| Kenny Foster
| Submission (guillotine choke)
| Bellator 41
| 
| align=center| 3
| align=center| 3:48
| Yuma, Arizona, United States
| 
|-
| Win
| align=center| 15–3
| Nazareno Malegarie
| Decision (unanimous)
| Bellator 37
| 
| align=center| 3
| align=center| 5:00
| Concho, Oklahoma, United States
| 
|-
| Win
| align=center| 14–3
| Karen Darabedyan
| Decision (unanimous)
| Shark Fights 13: Jardine vs Prangley
| 
| align=center| 3
| align=center| 5:00
| Amarillo, Texas, United States
| 
|-
| Win
| align=center| 13–3
| Joe Pearson
| TKO (punches)
| XFO 36: Outdoor War 6 
| 
| align=center| 2
| align=center| 4:04
| Island Lake, Illinois, United States
| 
|-
| Win
| align=center| 12–3
| Chad Hinton
| Decision (unanimous)
| Bellator 23
| 
| align=center| 3
| align=center| 5:00
| Louisville, Kentucky, United States
| 
|-
| Win
| align=center| 11–3
| Travis Perzynski
| Decision (unanimous)
| ICE: International Combat Events 45 
| 
| align=center| 3
| align=center| 5:00
| Forest Park, Ohio, United States
| 
|-
| Win
| align=center| 10–3
| Frank Caraballo
| TKO (punches)
| NAAFS: Caged Fury 9 
| 
| align=center| 5
| align=center| 3:57
| Cleveland, Ohio, United States
| 
|-
| Win
| align=center| 9–3
| Gideon Ray
| Decision (unanimous)
| XFO 33
| 
| align=center| 3
| align=center| 5:00
| Chicago, Illinois, United States
| 
|-
| Win
| align=center| 8–3
| Joe Heiland
| Decision (unanimous)
| NAAFS: Night of Champions 2009 
| 
| align=center| 3
| align=center| 5:00
| Akron, Ohio, United States
| 
|-
| Win
| align=center| 7–3
| Patrick Ferm
| TKO (punches)
| XFO 32 
| 
| align=center| 1
| align=center| 1:50
| New Munster, Wisconsin, United States
| 
|-
| Win
| align=center| 6–3
| Tim Troxell
| TKO (elbows and punches)
| Xtreme Caged Combat: Cops vs. Cons 
| 
| align=center| 1
| align=center| 3:51
| Reading, Pennsylvania, United States
| 
|-
| Win
| align=center| 5–3
| Mitch Lyons
| TKO (punches)
| Indiana Xtreme Fighting 1: Wildcard
| 
| align=center| 3
| align=center| 2:13
| Rising Sun, Indiana, United States
| 
|-
| Loss
| align=center| 4–3
| Pat Curran
| KO (punches)
| XFO 29 
| 
| align=center| 2
| align=center| 1:31
| Lakemoor, Illinois, United States
| 
|-
| Win
| align=center| 4–2
| Mike Baskis
| Decision (unanimous)
| ICF: Breakout 
| 
| align=center| 3
| align=center| 5:00
| Cincinnati, Ohio, United States
| 
|-
| Win
| align=center| 3–2
| Lester Caslow
| Decision (split)
| Extreme Challenge: Mayhem at the Marina
| 
| align=center| 3
| align=center| 5:00
| Atlantic City, New Jersey, United States
| 
|-
| Win
| align=center| 2–2
| Tim Cook
| TKO (punches)
| ICF: Turfwar 
| 
| align=center| 2
| align=center| 0:11
| Florence, Kentucky, United States
| 
|-
| Loss
| align=center| 1–2
| Scott Bickerstaff
| TKO (punches)
| MMA Big Show: Retribution 
| 
| align=center| 1
| align=center| N/A
| Switzerland County, Indiana, United States
| 
|-
| Win
| align=center| 1–1
| David Silva
| Decision (unanimous)
| XFO 28 
| 
| align=center| 3
| align=center| 5:00
| Lakemoor, Illinois, United States
| 
|-
| Loss
| align=center| 0–1
| Jay Ellis
| Submission (Rear-Naked Choke)
| XFO: New Blood
| 
| align=center| 2
| align=center| 2:46
| Delray Beach, Florida, United States
|

See also
List of male mixed martial artists
List of Bellator champions

References

External links
 

Living people
1984 births
American male mixed martial artists
Featherweight mixed martial artists
Mixed martial artists utilizing wrestling
African-American mixed martial artists
American male sport wrestlers
Amateur wrestlers
Bellator MMA champions
21st-century African-American sportspeople
20th-century African-American people